The National Library of Armenia ( (Hayastani Azgayin Gradaran)) is a national public library in Yerevan, Armenia. It was founded in 1832 as part of the state gymnasium-school of Yerevan. It is the official cultural repository for the entire republic.

History
The National Library of Armenia is the largest world repository of Armenian publishing products and the center of the national bibliography. Being a scientific, cultural, and information institution, the NLA creates the necessary conditions for collecting, processing, preserving, and disseminating the Armenian printed cultural heritage. The NLA is the national bibliographic center of Armenia. 

The National Library collections were formed based on the personal libraries of prominent state, public and cultural figures, as well as the collections of educational institutions. Currently, the library is home to a collection of 6.6 million books.

The library possesses an abundant fund consisting of various collections (books, journals, periodicals, dissertations, and synopsis, etc.), of which especially noticeable is the first Armenian printed book, "Urbatagirk" (The book of Friday, Venice, 1512.), the first Armenian periodical publication "Azdarar" (Bulletin, Madras, 1794-1796) as well as the first printed map in Armenian "Hamatarats Ashkharacuyc" (Universal World Map, Amsterdam, 1695). 

In 2012, the decision to digitalize the collections was made to provide open access to the unique collections of NLA. Today the digital collections of Armenian books and periodical production count more than ten million digitalized pages.

On the 4 July 1919, during the council meeting of the ministers of Armenia, a law regarding "The national public book depository" was adopted. Since 1999, 4 July is celebrated as the Day of the National Library of Armenia. In 2019, the day of the law's adoption celebrated its 100th anniversary.

The library is located in four buildings within the Kentron district of Yerevan. The oldest of them all – the main building – was built according to the project of Alexander Tamanyan in 1939 and meant to house around seven million books. The building features a special spatial and architectural style, the principle of uniqueness of early and medieval Armenian architecture received a new interpretation and quality and was established as the "Tamanyan style". The library's main building has gained the status of a historical and cultural architectural monument.

On 25 September 2017, the Museum of Book printing was opened inside the National Library of Armenia, where the history of book publishing is displayed in six halls; The Origins of the Book, The Armenian alphabet, The Early adopters of Armenian book printing, Diaspora of the Armenian book publishing, Typography and Immortality of Writing. As an exhibit, the museum displays rare books, book printing machines, and other unique artifacts.

The NLA cooperates with numerous national and leading libraries worldwide. The collection of NLA is annually replenished with copies of world literature through international book-sharing. The NLA cooperates with accredited embassies operating in Armenia, international organizations, and representatives of the Armenian diaspora, thereby contributing to the spread of the Armenian cultural heritage throughout the world.

Oldest units
The oldest printed book in the library is Urbatagirk, published in Venice, 1512.
The oldest map in the library dates back to 1695, published in Amsterdam.
The oldest newspaper in the library is Azdarar, published in Madras, 1794.

See also

Armenian literature
List of libraries
List of national and state libraries
Matenadaran

References

External links
Official Website of the National Library of Armenia
About National Library of Armenia

Libraries established in 1832
Library buildings completed in 1939
Armenian culture
Armenia
Libraries in Armenia
World Digital Library partners
Buildings and structures in Yerevan